Heep is a surname. Notable people with the surname include:

Danny Heep (born 1957), retired Major League Baseball outfielder
Franz Heep (1902–1978), German-Brazilian architect
Maria Heep-Altiner (born 1959), German mathematician, actuary and university lecturer
Sally Heep, fictional attorney on the American television series Boston Legal
Uriah Heep, fictional character created by Charles Dickens in his novel David Copperfield

See also
CCC Heep Woh College (中華基督教會協和書院), a secondary school in Tsz Wan Shan of Hong Kong
Heep Yunn School (協恩中學), an Anglican girls' secondary school in Ma Tau Wai, Kowloon, Hong Kong
The Great Heep, 48-minute, animated television special that aired on June 7, 1986
Uriah Heep (band), English hard rock band
Heap (disambiguation)
Heeps (surname)